The 2011–12 Maltese First Division (also known as 2011–12 BOV 1st Division due to sponsorship reasons) Started on 9 September 2011 and ended on 13 May 2012.

Teams
These teams will contest the Maltese First Division 2011-12 season:
 Birżebbuġa St. Peter's
 Dingli Swallows
 Lija Athletic
 Melita
 Naxxar Lions
 Pietà Hotspurs
 Rabat Ajax
 St. Andrews F.C.
 St. George's F.C
 St. Patrick F.C
 Vittoriosa Stars
 Żejtun Corinthians

Changes from previous season
 Balzan Youths, Mqabba and Mosta were promoted to the 2011–12 Maltese Premier League. They were replaced with  Vittoriosa Stars, relegated from 2010–11 Maltese Premier League
Msida Saint-Joseph were relegated to the 2011–12 Maltese Second Division. They were replaced with Zejtun Corinthians, Rabat Ajax, Naxxar Lions, Birżebbuġa St. Peter's and St. Patrick all promoted from 2010–11 Maltese Second Division.

Final league table

Results

Top scorers

References

External links
  2011-12 BOV First Division Kicks off 
Melita Win 2011-12 First Division 
Rabat Ajax Promoted to the Premier League  
 St Patrick and St Georges relegated to division 2 

Maltese First Division seasons
Malta
2